John C. Hollister, born in Manchester, Vermont on June 2, 1818, was the tenth Adjutant General of the State of Connecticut.  From 1850 to 1865 he was Justice of the Peace and as such Acting Judge of the City Court of New Haven, and served as clerk of the state senate in 1848.  He was a superintendent of the Sunday School of St. Paul's Episcopal Church in New Haven, as well as treasurer of the parish.

Military career
In his early manhood Hollister took a deep interest in military affairs. He was appointed Captain of the New Haven "Blues" militia, for ten years.  In 1855 Hollister was elected as Connecticut Adjutant General by Governor W. T Minor. Hollister for two years was an instructor in General Russell's military school.

Personal life
John Clark Hollister was the son of Marinus and Hannah Burton Hollister. He prepped for college at the Burr Seminary in Manchester, and graduated from Yale College in the class of 1840, followed by the study of law at Yale Law School and with the firm of Bates and Huntington in Northampton, Mass. In 1842 he was admitted to the Connecticut bar. He moved from Manchester, Vermont to New Haven.  On February 17, 1841, he married Martha L. Bradley of New Haven, Connecticut. He married his second wife, Sarah S. Shipman, October 31, 1850.  He had three children one boy and two girls; Herbet H. Hollister, Mary I. Hollister, and Caroline S. Hollister.  Hollister died of paralysis on August 29, 1903, in New Haven.

References

Military personnel from Connecticut
Connecticut Adjutant Generals
1818 births
1903 deaths
Yale University alumni
People from Manchester, Vermont